Leaving the Ways is an EP by The Briggs, and was released on July 27, 2004.

Track listing
All songs written by Joey LaRocca, except where noticed.
"One Shot Down" 
"Waiting in the Shadows" 
"All on Me" (Chris X)
"Dungeon Walls"
"Song for Us" (Jason LaRocca, Joey LaRocca)
"Top 40"

Line Up For The Album
 Joey - Vocals/Guitar
 Jason - Vocals/Guitar
 Chris X - Drums

Additional personnel

 Bass - Joe Gittleman
 Backup Vocals - Mike McColgan & Johnny Riox from the Street Dogs, Bryan Lothian from A Global Threat, Drew Suxx and Adam Shaw from Lost City Angels, and Joe Gittleman

The Briggs albums
2004 EPs
SideOneDummy Records EPs